Charles William Turner (June 8, 1846 – January 7, 1907) was a lawyer in Seattle and Montana, and once Adjutant General of Montana. As a youth during the American Civil War, he was a courier for Stonewall Jackson. Subsequently, he was one of the VMI cadets who fought at the Battle of New Market. He later moved to Montana to practice law and engaged in mining pursuits. Turner was shot to death in a Seattle bar by an assassin who was after one of Turner's clients.

Early years
Charles William Turner was born on June 6, 1846, in Stephens City, Virginia, then known as Newtown, to music professor A. J. Turner and Kate Aby. Charles sometimes signed his name Charles William H. Turner, perhaps due to his great-grandfather, Charles W. Hulett, who was a drummer in the Revolutionary War. By the late 1850s the family had moved to Staunton, and A. J. directed the Mountain Sax Horn Band.

Civil War
Turner gave his services to the Confederacy for the duration of the American Civil War.  By the end of the war Turner was commissioned a lieutenant.

Stonewall Brigade
Turner enlisted on June 9, 1861, in Shepherdstown, and was mustered into the 5th Virginia Infantry, CompanyL, known as the "West Augusta Guards", part of the Stonewall Brigade of Stonewall Jackson.

Turner ran mail as a courier under Jackson. He was detailed as an orderly to Jackson from July 10 to August 28, 1861, placing him at First Manassas.

An account of the Battle of Hoke's Run in the Staunton Spectator reads: "Little Charley Turner, a boy about 15 years of age, insisted so strongly on going with the Augusta Guards that his father finally yielded to his importunities and allowed him to go. The result shows that little Charley went to perform service, for he made one of the enemy bite the dust."

VMI

Turner enrolled at Virginia Military Institute (VMI) on April15, 1864. He graduated from VMI in 1867. Edward Magruder Tutwiler was a member of the same class.

Battle of New Market
Soon after he enrolled, Turner was one of the cadets who participated in the Battle of New Market, as a private in CompanyC. Major General John C. Breckinridge reluctantly ordered the charge of the young cadets to fill a gap in his right wing, resulting in the cadets having taken part in the Confederacy's last major victory of the war. The cadet battalion captured a Union cannon. Turner was listed as "slightly wounded", as was John Sergeant Wise of CompanyD. Years later, another cadet in Turner's company wrote an account of the events preceding the charge.

Post war
After the war, Turner engaged in mercantile pursuits in his native Staunton as well as Baltimore. While in Baltimore he worked for the firm of Chaney, Randall, and Co. In Staunton he was a merchandise auctioneer with partner W.M. Chewning. There, Turner was also a member of the "Philomathesian Society" (cf. the Philomathean Society).

Montana

Near the end of 1869, he moved to Montana, where he was admitted to the bar to practice law. He was in Meagher County by 1870.

Mining
Turner became interested in mining pursuits due to gold discoveries, and moved to Bannack around 1875. While there, a major washout of his flume resulting in a loss of two years' earnings caused him to return to his law practice.

He also spent time in Virginia City. He was one of the counsel for the territorial officers when the capital of Montana moved from Virginia City to Helena in 1875.

Glendale
Turner then moved to Glendale, where he served as chairman of the Democratic ratification meeting. A band leading the procession played a medley in front of Turner's "brilliantly lighted residence".

Marriage
On September 11, 1879, Turner married Emma Armstrong, daughter of Noah Armstrong, in Glendale. She bore his first son, Armstrong Memory Turner, in Glendale on July25, 1880.

Helena

Turner lived in Glendale until about 1886 when he sold his mining interests and moved to Helena, where he worked for the law firm of Kinsley & Turner, partnering with Joseph Kinsley. When Turner left he was replaced by Ella Knowles Haskell, the first woman to practice law in Montana.

He was also an active member of the Freemasons. In 1889, the meeting of the stockholders of the Bowling Mining Company met at his house. Another son, Charles Jr., was born on April20, 1889, in Helena.

Adjutant General
Turner was appointed Adjutant General of Montana by Governor Preston Leslie in February 1887. Due to this appointment, the title "General" often precedes Turner's name. He was the first to hold the office since Martin Beem in 1867. The state militia was formed after much action from volunteer companies against Indians. Turner said of the organization:

Seattle

Not long after the Great Seattle Fire, Turner moved to Seattle, Washington. Turner practiced law with James B. Metcalfe, the first Attorney General of the state, and Andrew F. Burleigh, with whom he had partnered in Helena. Metcalfe and Turner remained law partners until January 1892. Turner then was part of the law firm of Turner & McCutcheon until the partnership dissolved on January27, 1894. He then practiced independently, living for many years at the corner of 9thAvenue and AlderSt.

Assassination
On January 7, 1907, Turner was shot to death by one T.W. Emmons in the saloon of Russell & Mix at 1206First Avenue for alleged wrongs between Emmons and Turner's client Andy T. Russell.

Russell was one of the owners of the saloon. Emmons had invested his only money upon arriving in Seattle in a cigar shop in front of the saloon, and had received notice to vacate the street. Russell was shot in the left shoulder. Turner was shot in the liver and the spine. Upon being struck, Turner ran to the front door and had nearly reached it when he collapsed and died. Russell ran into a nearby hotel before realizing he too was shot. The assassin Emmons then looked at himself in a large mirror and shot himself in the right temple. He left a note for the coroner explaining his motives. It seems Russell was the target of the attack, though the letter makes some reference to "Russell's pussy-cat lawyer".

Funeral
Turner was buried on January 10 in Seattle's Lake View Cemetery. The services were under the auspices of Seattle Commandery No.2, Knights Templars, of which he was a member. The funeral was largely attended and the casket containing the remains was banked with floral offerings. The following sir knights acted as pallbearers: J.M. Palmer, J.C. Peterson, E.W. Craven, W.V. Rinehart, R.C. Hassen, and H.A. Raser. The honorary pallbearers were: J.T. Ronald, J.B. Jurey, Andrew Hemrich, J.F. Hale, S.S. Carlisle, P.P. Carroll, and ex-Judge Alfred.

Notes

References

External links

Letter from Turner to Major Garnett Andrews

1846 births
1907 deaths
People from Stephens City, Virginia
People from Staunton, Virginia
People from Beaverhead County, Montana
Lawyers from Seattle
Confederate States Army officers
Stonewall Brigade
Virginia Military Institute alumni
People murdered in Washington (state)
New Market cadets
People from Helena, Montana
People of Virginia in the American Civil War